Oriol Paulo (born 30 July 1975) is a Spanish screenwriter and director. He is known for crime thriller movies such as The Body (2012) and The Invisible Guest (2016). Both films garnered international acclaim and were remade in several languages.

Career 
Born in Barcelona in 1975, Oriol Paulo earned a licentiate degree in audiovisual communication from the Pompeu Fabra University in 1998. He studied film at the Los Angeles Film School.

As a scriptwriter, he wrote screenplays for small screen films such as Ecos (2006) and Codi 60 (2011).

In cinema, he made himself known as a co-screenwriter alongside Guillem Morales with the thriller Julia's Eyes (2010), produced by Guillermo del Toro. But he had already made some short films such as McGuffin (1998, scriptwriter and director), Tapes (2002, scriptwriter and director) and Eve (2002, scriptwriter and director).

He made his debut as feature film director with the 2012 film The Body, which he also wrote. Paulo was nominated for Best New Director at the Goya Awards and won the Best Film Award at the Fantastic Film Festival in Paris for The Body. In 2016 he wrote the script of Boy Missing, directed by Mar Tarragona. In 2017 Paulo wrote and directed The Invisible Guest, which featured Mario Casas, Barbara Lennie and José Coronado as lead performers. The latter film commanded a great box office performance in China.

From 2016 onwards, Oriol Paulo works as the writer and director of the television series .

Filmography

Film

Short Film

Television

References

External links 
 

1975 births
Living people
People from Barcelona
21st-century Spanish screenwriters
Spanish film directors